The McCarthy–Platt House, at 1000 Plumas St. in Reno, Nevada, is a historic house that was originally built in 1900 and was redesigned in 1925 by architect Frederic J. DeLongchamps.  It includes Colonial Revival architecture elements.
It was listed on the National Register of Historic Places in 1984.  It was deemed significant for association with its architect Frederic J. DeLongchamps, for its associations with Reno developer Charles McCarthy and Nevada attorney/politician Samuel Platt, and "as a noteworthy example" of Colonial Revival architecture in Nevada.

References 

Houses completed in 1900
Houses on the National Register of Historic Places in Nevada
Colonial Revival architecture in Nevada
Houses in Reno, Nevada
National Register of Historic Places in Reno, Nevada
Frederic Joseph DeLongchamps buildings